This is a list of the members of the European Parliament for Spain in the 1984 to 1989 session. See 1987 European Parliament election in Spain for election results.

List

References

 
1987-1989